Col de l'Aiguillon (el. 1293 m.) is a Swiss pass in the Jura Mountains in the canton of Vaud.

The pass connects L'Auberson and Baulmes. The road is 13.7 km long and has a maximum grade of 18 percent.

The cliff between the Col de l'Aiguillon and the highest point in the neighboring mountains, the Aiguilles de Baulmes, is a popular climbing wall for mountaineers.

See also
 List of highest paved roads in Europe
 List of mountain passes
List of the highest Swiss passes

References

Aiguillon
Aiguillon
Mountain passes of the canton of Vaud